Middleback Range is a locality in the Australian state of  South Australia located in the north east corner of Eyre Peninsula to the south-west of the city of Whyalla and extending from the coastline of Spencer Gulf in the east to the west side of the southern end of the Middleback Range in the west.

Its boundaries were created on 26 April 2013 while its name which is ultimately derived from the mountain range of the same name reflects the use of a “long established local name”.  Its boundaries were again adjusted in 2014 in association with the creation of the new locality of Cultana.

Middleback Range is located within the federal Division of Grey, the state electoral district of Giles and with part of its eastern side being within the boundary of local government area of the City of Whyalla and the western side being within the Pastoral Unincorporated Area of South Australia. The Lincoln Highway passes through the locality on its way from the city of Whyalla to the city of Port Lincoln.

See also
List of cities and towns in South Australia
Whyalla - Cowleds Landing Aquatic Reserve

References

Towns in South Australia
Suburbs of Whyalla
Places in the unincorporated areas of South Australia